Mr. Box Office is an American syndicated sitcom that premiered on September 22, 2012. The series centers on Marcus Jackson (Bill Bellamy), a well-known movie actor who ends up in legal trouble due to a physical altercation with a paparazzo, leading to his sentence to teach a class of inner-city high school students in Los Angeles' infamous South Central neighborhood. The following is a list of episodes of the program, shown in order of its broadcast airdate.

Series overview

Episodes

Season 1 (2012–13)

Season 2 (2013–15)

References 

General references 
 
 
 

Lists of American sitcom episodes